Below is a partial list of Minor League Baseball players in the Los Angeles Dodgers system.

Players

Drew Avans

Drew Avans (born June 13, 1996) is an American professional baseball Outfielder in the Los Angeles Dodgers organization.

Avans was drafted by the Dodgers in the 33rd round of the 2018 MLB Draft out of Southeastern Louisiana University. He began his career with the Arizona League Dodgers before promotions to the Ogden Raptors and Great Lakes Loons, hitting .284 in a combined 60 games. In 2019, he played with Great Lakes, the Rancho Cucamonga Quakes and Tulsa Drillers, hitting .280 in 112 games. After the 2020 minor league season was cancelled because of the COVID-19 pandemic, he was promoted to the Triple-A Oklahoma City Dodgers for 2021.

Southeastern Louisiana Lions bio

Maddux Bruns

Maddux John Bruns (born June 20, 2002) is an American professional baseball pitcher in the Los Angeles Dodgers organization.

Bruns grew up in Saraland, Alabama and attended UMS-Wright Preparatory School. He was named Alabama's Gatorade Baseball Player of the Year and Mr. Baseball as a senior after going 7-0 with a 0.86 ERA and 102 strikeouts and just 13 hits and six earned runs allowed in 49 innings pitched. He committed to play college baseball at Mississippi State.

Bruns was selected 29th overall in the 2021 Major League Baseball draft by the Los Angeles Dodgers. He signed with the Dodgers for a $2.2 million signing bonus. In his first professional season, he started four games for the Arizona Complex League Dodgers, allowing nine runs on eight hits and seven walks while striking out five in five innings of work. He made 21 starts for the Rancho Cucamonga Quakes of the Class-A California League in 2022, with an 0–2 record and 5.68 ERA.

Diego Cartaya

 Diego Armando Cartaya (born September 7, 2001) is a Venezuelan professional baseball catcher in the Los Angeles Dodgers organization.

Cartaya was rated as MLB Pipeline's top international prospect when he signed with the Dodgers on July 2, 2018. He made his professional debut in 2019 with the Dodgers Arizona League affiliates, hitting .281 in 41 games. He was rated as the Dodgers ninth best prospect going into the 2020 season. and was added to the Dodgers 60-man player pool for the pandemic affected season. In 2021, with the Rancho Cucamonga Quakes he appeared in 31 games and hit .298 with 10 homers and 31 RBI. However, he was placed on the injured list on August 1 with a strained hamstring and missed the rest of the season. He was selected to represent the Dodgers at the 2022 All-Star Futures Game. Cartaya was selected by the Dodgers as their 2022 Branch Rickey Minor League Player of the Year. He appeared in 33 games for the Quakes and 62 games for the Great Lakes Loons, hitting a combined .254 with 22 home runs and 72 RBI. 

After the season, the Dodgers added Cartaya to the 40-man roster. Cartaya was optioned to the Double-A Tulsa Drillers to begin the 2023 season.

Hyun-il Choi

 Hyun-il Choi (born May 27, 2000) is a Korean professional baseball pitcher in the Los Angeles Dodgers organization.

Choi was signed by the Los Angeles Dodgers in 2018 for a $300,000 signing bonus as a 17-year old High School pitcher from Korea. He made his professional debut in 2019 with in the Arizona League, where he was 5–1 with a 2.63 ERA in 14 games (11 starts). He struck out 71 in 65 innings.

Choi missed the 2020 season as a result of the cancellation of the minor league season due to the COVID-19 pandemic and was assigned to the Rancho Cucamonga Quakes to start the 2021 season before being promoted to High-A Great Lakes Loons at mid-season. Across the two levels, he was 8–6 with a 3.72 ERA in 24 games (11 starts) and struck out 106 batters in  innings while only walking 18. The Dodgers recognized him by awarding him the organizations Branch Rickey Minor League Pitcher of the Year Award. Choi only pitched in one game for Great Lakes in 2022 before being shut down with forearm inflammation.

Keegan Curtis

Keegan Edward Curtis (born September 30, 1995) is an American professional baseball pitcher for the Los Angeles Dodgers organization.

Curtis attended Davidson High School in Mobile, Alabama, and played college baseball at the University of Louisiana at Monroe. In the summer of 2016, he played in the Jayhawk Collegiate League. As a senior in 2018, he went 3–2 with a 2.88 ERA and seven saves over  relief innings. Following the season's end, he was selected by the New York Yankees in the 22nd round of the 2018 Major League Baseball draft.

Curtis signed with the Yankees and made his professional debut with the Gulf Coast League Yankees before being promoted to the Staten Island Yankees; over  relief innings, he had a 6.23 ERA. In 2019, he began the year with Staten Island and was promoted to the Charleston RiverDogs in August. Curtis pitched to a 3–1 record and 1.39 ERA over 16 relief appearances with both clubs. He began the 2021 season with the Somerset Patriots.

On July 1, 2021, Curtis was traded to the Arizona Diamondbacks in exchange for Tim Locastro. He was assigned to the Amarillo Sod Poodles, and was promoted to the Reno Aces after four appearances. He missed half of August and nearly all of September due to injury. Over  innings pitched in relief between Somerset, Amarillo, and Reno, Curtis went 3-4 with a 4.28 ERA and 35 strikeouts. He was selected to play in the Arizona Fall League for the Salt River Rafters after the season. He returned to Amarillo to begin the 2022 season. Arizona released him on June 6, 2022, after posting an 8.44 ERA over 16 innings with Amarillo.

On June 8, he signed a minor league contract with the Los Angeles Dodgers and was assigned to the Double-A Tulsa Drillers. He pitched in 16 games for them to a 7.13 ERA and then was promoted to the Triple-A Oklahoma City Dodgers, where he made three appearances and allowed three runs in  innings.

Jonny DeLuca

Jonathan Davis DeLuca (born July 10, 1998) is an American professional baseball outfielder in the Los Angeles Dodgers organization.

DeLuca attended Agoura High School in Agoura Hills, California. He was drafted by the Minnesota Twins in the 39th round of the 2017 Major League Baseball Draft, but did not sign and played college baseball at the University of Oregon. After two years at Oregon, he was drafted by the Los Angeles Dodgers in the 25th round of the 2019 MLB Draft and signed.

DeLuca made his professional debut with the Arizona League Dodgers in 2019, where he hit .273 in 26 games. He did not play in 2020 due to the Minor League Baseball season being cancelled because of the Covid-19 pandemic. He returned in 2021 to play for the Rancho Cucamonga Quakes and Great Lakes Loons, hitting a combined .264 in 101 games with 22 home runs and 64 RBI. DeLuca started 2022 with Great Lakes before being promoted to the Tulsa Drillers. Between the two levels, he played in 98 games and hit .260 with 25 homers and 71 RBI. 

After the season, the Dodgers added DeLuca to the 40-man roster. DeLuca was optioned to the Triple-A Oklahoma City Dodgers to begin the 2023 season.

Nick Frasso

Nicholas Paul Frasso (born October 18, 1998) is an American professional baseball pitcher in the Los Angeles Dodgers organization.

Frasso played college baseball for the Loyola Marymount Lions. He began his freshman season as a starter before being moved to the bullpen and was named to the West Coast Conference All-Freshman team. Frasso was named second team All-WCC as a sophomore after going 2-2 with 10 saves and a 2.22 ERA in 19 appearances. In 2019, he played collegiate summer baseball with the Orleans Firebirds of the Cape Cod Baseball League.

Frasso was drafted by the Toronto Blue Jays in the fourth round of the 2020 Major League Baseball draft. He was assigned to the Low-A Dunedin Blue Jays in 2021, where he pitched in three games before suffering a partial tear in the ulnar collateral ligament in his pitching elbow. Frasso returned to Dunedin at the start of the 2022 season. Frasso had a 0.70 ERA with 48 strikeouts in  innings pitched at Dunedin before being promoted to the Vancouver Canadians of the High-A Northwest League.

On August 2, 2022, Frasso and Moises Brito were traded to the Los Angeles Dodgers in exchange for Mitch White and Alex De Jesus. The Dodgers assigned him to the Great Lakes Loons, where he allowed only one earned run in  innings the rest of the season.

Loyola Marymount Lions bio

Bryan Hudson

Bryan Michael Hudson (born May 8, 1997) is an American professional baseball pitcher in the Los Angeles Dodgers organization.

Hudson attended Alton High School in Alton, Illinois. He was drafted by the Chicago Cubs in the third round of the 2015 Major League Baseball draft. He made his professional debut with the Arizona League Cubs.

Hudson pitched 2016 with the Eugene Emeralds, 2017 with the South Bend Cubs, 2018 with the Myrtle Beach Pelicans, and 2019 with Myrtle Beach and the Arizona League Cubs. He  did not pitch for a team in 2020 due to the cancellation of the Minor League Baseball season because of the Covid-19 pandemic. Hudson returned in 2021 to pitch for the Tennessee Smokies and Iowa Cubs. He started 2022 with Tennessee before being promoted to Iowa. 

Hudson signed with the Los Angeles Dodgers on a minor league contract before the 2023 season.

Kyle Hurt

Kyle Dillon Hurt (born May 30, 1998) is an American professional baseball pitcher in the Los Angeles Dodgers organization.

Hurt attended Torrey Pines High School in San Diego, California, where he played baseball. For his high school career, he had a 1.51 ERA and 187 strikeouts. He missed time during his senior season in 2017 due to a knee injury, and went unselected in the 2017 Major League Baseball draft.

Hurt enrolled at the University of Southern California where he played three seasons of college baseball. In 2018, he played collegiate summer baseball in the Cape Cod Baseball League with the Chatham Anglers. He ended his collegiate career with a 9-13 record, a 5.06 ERA and 170 strikeouts over  innings pitched. He was selected by the Miami Marlins in the fifth round with the 134th overall selection of the shortened 2020 Major League Baseball draft. He signed for $300,000.

On February 12, 2021, the Marlins traded Hurt and Alex Vesia to the Los Angeles Dodgers in exchange for Dylan Floro. He split his first professional season between the Arizona League Dodgers and the Rancho Cucamonga Quakes, going 2-2 with a 5.57 ERA over 21 innings pitched. After the season, he played in the Arizona Fall League with the Glendale Desert Dogs. He opened the 2022 season with the Great Lakes Loons and was promoted to the Tulsa Drillers in early July. Between the two levels, he pitched in 25 games (19 starts) and finished with a 5–7 record, a 5.27 ERA, and 109 strikeouts over  innings.

USC Trojans bio

Marshall Kasowski

Marshall Austin Kasowski (born March 10, 1995) is an American professional baseball pitcher in the Los Angeles Dodgers organization.

Kasowski attended Oak Ridge High School in Conroe, Texas and played college baseball at the Panola College, the University of Houston and West Texas A&M University. In 2015, he suffered serious head injuries in a car accident that nearly ended his baseball career.

Kasowski was drafted by the Los Angeles Dodgers in the 13th round of the 2017 Major League Baseball draft. He spent his first professional season with the Arizona League Dodgers and Great Lakes Loons, pitching to a combined 1–1 record with a 3.18 ERA in 11.1 innings pitched. In 2018, he played for Great Lakes, the Rancho Cucamonga Quakes and Tulsa Drillers. In 41 games between the three clubs, he pitched to a 2–1 record with a 2.09 ERA, striking out 111 batters in 64.2 innings pitched. In 2019, he returned to Tulsa where he appeared in 27 games and was 4–3 with a 2.27 ERA. The minor league season was cancelled in 2020 as a result of the COVID-19 pandemic and he started 2021 on the injured list, eventually pitching in 13 games between the AAA Oklahoma City Dodgers and the ACL Dodgers, with a 4.38 ERA. He made 47 appearances for Oklahoma City in 2022, with a 3.70 ERA.

Landon Knack

Landon Dakota Knack (born July 15, 1997) is an American professional baseball pitcher in the Los Angeles Dodgers organization.

Knack attended Science Hill High School in Johnson City, Tennessee and played college baseball at East Tennessee State University. He was drafted by the Los Angeles Dodgers in the second round of the 2020 MLB draft.

Knack made his professional debut in 2021 with the Great Lakes Loons and was promoted to the Tulsa Drillers during the season. Between the two levels, he was 7–1 with a 3.18 ERA in 16 appearances (11 starts) and struck out 82 batters while only walking eight. He was selected to play for the Glendale Desert Dogs of the Arizona Fall League after the season. In 2022, he made 17 starts for Tulsa, with a 2–10 record and 5.01 ERA.

Eddys Leonard

Eddys Leopoldo Leonard (born November 10, 2000) is a Dominican professional baseball infielder in the Los Angeles Dodgers organization.

Leonard signed with the Los Angeles Dodgers as an international free agent in July 2017. He made his debut in the Dominican Summer League in 2018, hitting .248 in 45 games. In 2019 he played in 55 games, with the majority of them being for the Arizona League Dodgers and hit .285. After sitting out the 2020 season due to the cancellation of the minor league season by the COVID-19 pandemic, he split the 2021 season between the Great Lakes Loons and the Rancho Cucamonga Quakes, hitting .296 with 22 home runs and 81 RBI in 107 games. 

On November 19, 2021, Leonard was added to the Dodgers 40-man roster to be protected from the Rule 5 draft. In the 2022 season, he played in 127 games for Great Lakes, hitting .264 with 15 homers and 61 RBI. Leonard was optioned to the Double-A Tulsa Drillers to begin the 2023 season.

Brandon Lewis

Brandon Michael Lewis (born October 23, 1998) is an American professional baseball third baseman in the Los Angeles Dodgers organization.

Lewis attended Bishop Alemany High School in Mission Hills, California. As a senior in 2016, he hit .366 with seven home runs. After high school, he enrolled at Los Angeles Pierce College where he batted .419 with nine home runs and 39 RBIs in 2017 and .399 with 17 home runs and 55 RBIs in 2018. He transferred to the University of California, Irvine in 2019 where he batted .315 with 14 home runs and 54 RBIs over 54 games. After the season, he was selected by the Los Angeles Dodgers in the fourth round with the 131st overall pick in the 2019 Major League Baseball draft.

Lewis signed with the Dodgers and spent his first professional season with the Arizona League Dodgers, Ogden Raptors, and Great Lakes Loons, batting .297 with 13 home runs and 46 RBIs over 56 games. He did not play a game in 2020 due to the cancellation of the minor league season. In 2021, he split the year between the Rancho Cucamonga Quakes and Great Lakes, hitting .269 with thirty home runs and 86 RBIs over 99 games. He was assigned to the Tulsa Drillers for the 2022 season. Over 110 games, he batted .209 with 24 home runs and 71 RBIs.

UC Irvine bio

Devin Mann

Devin Jacob Mann (born February 11, 1997) is an American professional baseball second baseman in the Los Angeles Dodgers organization.

Mann attended Columbus North High School in Columbus, Indiana, where he played baseball. In 2015, as a senior, he batted .410 with nine home runs, earning All-State honors. Undrafted in the 2015 Major League Baseball draft, he enrolled at the University of Louisville where he played college baseball.

In 2016, Mann's freshman season at Louisville, he played in 39 games, batting .303 with nine doubles and 17 RBIs, earning a spot on the ACC All-Freshman team. That summer, he played in the New England Collegiate Baseball League with the Newport Gulls. As a sophomore at Louisville in 2017, Mann started 64 games, hitting .268 with eight home runs and 44 RBIs. That summer, he played briefly in the Cape Cod Baseball League for the Orleans Firebirds. In 2018, his junior year, he slashed .303/.446/.504 with seven home runs, 52 RBIs, and 15 stolen bases. Following the season, he was selected by the Los Angeles Dodgers in the fifth round of the 2018 Major League Baseball draft.

Mann signed with the Dodgers and made his professional debut with the Rookie-level Arizona League Dodgers before being promoted to the Great Lakes Loons of the Class A Midwest League, where he finished the year. Over 65 games, he batted .240 with two home runs and thirty RBIs. Mann spent 2019 with the Rancho Cucamonga Quakes of the Class A-Advanced California League, with whom he was named an All-Star alongside being named the league's Player of the Month for June. Over 98 games with the Quakes for the year, Mann slashed .278/.358/.496 with 19 home runs and 63 RBIs. He played in the Arizona Fall League for the Glendale Desert Dogs after the season. Mann was assigned to the Tulsa Drillers of the Double-A Central for the 2021 season where he hit .244 with 14 home runs, 62 RBIs, and 27 doubles over 110 games. He returned to Tulsa to begin the 2022 season before he was promoted to the Oklahoma City Dodgers in early August. Between the two levels, he played in 118 games with a .264 batting average, 16 home runs and 61 RBIs.

Louisville Cardinals bio

Nick Nastrini

Nicholas Nastrini (born February 18, 2000) is an American professional baseball pitcher in the Los Angeles Dodgers organization.

Nastrini attended Cathedral Catholic High School in San Diego, California, where he played on their baseball team. As a senior in 2018, he went 8-2 with a 2.41 ERA and 44 strikeouts over  innings. That summer, he played in the West Coast League for the Bellingham Bells. He went undrafted in the 2018 Major League Baseball draft and enrolled at UCLA to play college baseball.

As a freshman at UCLA in 2019, Nastrini made four starts and posted a 1.37 ERA over  innings, missing a majority of the season due to thoracic outlet syndrome. He returned healthy that summer and played for the Falmouth Commodores of the Cape Cod Baseball League. He started four games in 2020 before the season was cancelled due to the COVID-19 pandemic. He played in the California Collegiate League for the Santa Barbara Foresters over the summer. As a junior in 2021, Nastrini made 12 appearances (seven starts) and went 2-2 with a 6.89 ERA, 48 strikeouts, and 38 walks over  innings. He was selected by the Los Angeles Dodgers in the fourth round of the 2021 Major League Baseball draft, and signed.

Nastrini made his professional debut with the Arizona Complex League Dodgers and was promoted to the Rancho Cucamonga Quakes after one start. Over seven starts between the two clubs, he posted a 1.93 ERA with 32 strikeouts and seven walks in 14 innings. He opened the 2022 season with the Great Lakes Loons and was promoted to the Tulsa Drillers on August 15. Between the two levels, he made 27 starts and finished with a 6–4 record, a 3.93 ERA and 169 strikeouts over  innings.

UCLA Bruins bio

Andy Pages

Andy Pages (born December 8, 2000) is a Cuban professional baseball outfielder in the Los Angeles Dodgers organization.

Pages signed with the Dodgers for $300,000 in 2018 after defecting from Cuba, where he was a star in the U15 league in 2015, hitting .364/.484/.581 with 25 walks and just three strikeouts in 161 plate appearances. He appeared in 10 games for the Arizona League Dodgers and 42 for the Dominican Summer League Dodgers that year, hitting .229. The following season, with the rookie level Ogden Raptors, he led the league in extra base hits with 43 and ranked second in homers (19), RBI (55), total bases (153) and slugging (.651) as an 18-year-old. He did not play a minor league game in 2020 since the season was cancelled due to the COVID-19 pandemic. He was assigned to the Great Lakes Loons for 2021. He played in 120 games for the Loons, hitting .265 with 31 home runs and 88 RBI. He was selected as a post-season High-A Central all-star, and he was also named Most Valuable Player and Top MLB Prospect of the league. In 2022, he played for the Tulsa Drillers of the Double-A Texas League, hitting .236 with 26 home runs and 80 RBI. 

After the season, the Dodgers added Pages to the 40-man roster. Pages was optioned to the Triple-A Oklahoma City Dodgers to begin the 2023 season.

José Ramos

José Antonio Ramos (born January 1, 2001) is a Panamanian professional baseball outfielder in the Los Angeles Dodgers organization.

Ramos signed with the Los Angeles Dodgers as an international free agent in July 2018. He made his professional debut in 2019 with the Dominican Summer League Dodgers.

Ramos did not play for a team in 2020 due to the Minor League Baseball season being cancelled because of the Covid-19 pandemic. He returned in 2021 to play for the Arizona Complex League Dodgers and Rancho Cucamonga Quakes. In 2022, he played for Rancho Cucamonga and the Great Lakes Loons. 

After the 2022 season, Ramos played for the Panama national baseball team in the 2023 World Baseball Classic qualification.

Nick Robertson

Nicholas Parker Robertson (born July 16, 1998) is an American professional baseball pitcher in the Los Angeles Dodgers organization.

Robertson attended Franklin County High School in Rocky Mount, Virginia and played college baseball at James Madison University. He was drafted by the Los Angeles Dodgers in the seventh round of the 2019 MLB draft.

Robertson spent his first professional season with the Arizona League Dodgers and Ogden Raptors. He did not play a minor league game in 2020 since the season was cancelled due to the COVID-19 pandemic. In 2021, Robertson was invited to Spring Training by the Dodgers. He played the 2021 season with the Tulsa Drillers, where he was 2–4 with a 4.30 ERA in 39 games while striking out 63 in  innings. In 2022, he pitched in 44 games for Tulsa and nine for the Triple-A Oklahoma City Dodgers, with a combined 4.43 ERA.

Dalton Rushing

Dalton Wayne Rushing (born February 21, 2001) is an American college baseball catcher in the Los Angeles Dodgers organization. He previously played college baseball for the Louisville Cardinals.

Rushing attended Brighton High School in Brighton, Tennessee where he played baseball. As a senior in 2019, he batted .491 with 11 home runs and 46 RBIs and earned All-State honors. He went undrafted in the 2019 Major League Baseball draft and enrolled at the University of Louisville to play college baseball.

Due to Henry Davis being named Louisville's starting catcher in 2020, Rushing began playing first base and started six games for the season before it was cancelled due to the COVID-19 pandemic. He appeared in 28 games in 2021, batting .254 with four home runs and 14 RBIs. After the season, he played in the Cape Cod Baseball League with the Bourne Braves with whom he batted .314 with six home runs over 118 at-bats and was named a league all-star. After Davis was selected first overall in the 2021 Major League Baseball draft, Rushing was named Louisville's starting catcher for the 2022 season. He finished the season having appeared in 64 games, slashing .310/.470/.686 with 23 home runs, 62 RBIs, and 16 doubles. He was named an All-American, and ended the season as a top prospect for the upcoming MLB draft.

Rushing was selected by the Los Angeles Dodgers in the second round with the 40th pick of the 2022 Major League Baseball draft. He signed with the Dodgers for a $1,959,390 signing bonus on July 30, 2022.

Rushing made his professional debut with the Arizona Complex League Dodgers and was promoted to the Rancho Cucamonga Quakes after two games. He played in 28 games for the Quakes, hitting .424  with eight home runs and thirty RBIs. At the end of the regular season, he was promoted to the Great Lakes Loons so he could play in the Midwest League playoffs. He drove in three runs in three games in the playoffs and had two hits in nine at-bats with two walks and two hit by pitches.

Rushing's brother, Logan, plays college baseball at the University of Memphis.

Louisville Cardinals bio

Emmet Sheehan

Emmet Sheehan (born August 19, 1997) is an American baseball pitcher in the Los Angeles Dodgers organization.

Sheehan played college baseball at Boston College for three seasons. As a junior, he went 5-5 with a 4.23 ERA and 106 strikeouts in  innings pitched.

Sheehan was selected in the sixth round by the Los Angeles Dodgers in the 2021 Major League Baseball draft. After signing with the team he was assigned to the Rookie-level Arizona Complex League Dodgers to start his professional career before being promoted to the Low-A Rancho Cucamonga Quakes and then a second time to the High-A Great Lakes Loons. Sheehan finished the season with a 3-0 record and a 5.17 ERA with 34 strikeouts in  innings pitched over seven appearances. He returned to Great Lakes to start the 2022 season. He appeared in 18 games (12 starts) for the Loons and then made two starts after a late season call-up to the Double-A Tulsa Drillers. He had a 7–2 record and 2.91 ERA between the two teams with 106 strikeouts.

Boston College Eagles bio

Gavin Stone

Gavin Blaine Stone (born October 15, 1998) is an American professional baseball pitcher in the Los Angeles Dodgers organization.

Stone attended Riverside High School in Lake City, Arkansas and played college baseball at the University of Central Arkansas. As a sophomore in 2019, he appeared in twenty games (two starts) and went 4-3 with a 1.52 ERA and 58 strikeouts over  innings. He made four starts in 2020 before the season was cancelled due to the COVID-19 pandemic. He was selected by the Los Angeles Dodgers in the fifth round with the 159th overall pick of the shortened 2020 Major League Baseball draft. He signed for $100,000.

Stone made his professional debut in 2021 with the Rancho Cucamonga Quakes and was promoted to the Great Lakes Loons in mid-August. Over 22 starts between the two teams, he went 2-3 with a 3.76 ERA and 138 strikeouts over 91 innings. 

He returned to Great Lakes to open the 2022 season. After six starts in which he went 1-1 with a 1.44 ERA over 25 innings, he was promoted to the Tulsa Drillers. After 13 starts with Tulsa in which he posted a 6-4 record, a 1.60 ERA, and 107 strikeouts over  innings, he was promoted to the Oklahoma City Dodgers in mid-August, where he had a 1.16 ERA in six starts and ended his season by striking out 11 in six scoreless innings against the Salt Lake Bees. For the 2022 minor league season, he was 9-6 with a 1.48 ERA in  innings in which he struck out 168 batters. Stone was selected by the Dodgers as their 2022 Branch Rickey Minor League Pitcher of the Year.

Central Arkansas Bears bio

Josh Stowers

Joshua Stowers (born February 25, 1997) is an American professional baseball outfielder for the Los Angeles Dodgers organization.

Stowers attended Mount Carmel High School in Chicago, Illinois. He attended the University of Louisville and played college baseball for the Louisville Cardinals. In 2017, he played collegiate summer baseball with the Chatham Anglers of the Cape Cod Baseball League. The Seattle Mariners selected him in the second round of the 2018 MLB draft. He signed with the Mariners and was assigned to the Everett AquaSox, batting .260 with five home runs, 28 RBIs, and twenty stolen bases over 58 games.

On January 21, 2019, the Mariners traded Stowers to the New York Yankees for Shed Long. He spent 2019 with the Charleston RiverDogs, slashing .273/.386/.400 with seven home runs, 40 RBIs, and 35 stolen bases over 105 games. He did not play in 2020 due to the cancellation of the Minor League Baseball season because of the COVID-19 pandemic. On April 6, 2021, the Yankees traded Stowers and Antonio Cabello to the Texas Rangers for Rougned Odor. Stowers spent the 2021 season with the Frisco RoughRiders of the Double-A Central, hitting .220/.311/.466/.776 with 20 home runs, 21 stolen bases, and 57 RBI. Stowers returned to Frisco for the 2022 season, hitting just .222/.331/.374/.705 with 10 home runs and 49 RBI. 

Stowers was selected by the Los Angeles Dodgers in the minor league phase of the 2022 Rule 5 draft.

Jorbit Vivas  

Jorbit Jose Vivas (born March 9, 2001) is a Venezuelan professional baseball infielder in the Los Angeles Dodgers organization.

Vivas signed with the Los Angeles Dodgers as an international free agent in July 2017 and began his career in 2018 with the Dodgers affiliate in the Dominican Summer League, hitting .222 in 51 games. In 2019 he played for the Arizona League Dodgers and the Ogden Raptors, hitting a combined .327 in 54 games. After the 2020 minor league season was cancelled due to the COVID-19 pandemic, Vivas played for the Rancho Cucamonga Quakes and Great Lakes Loons in 2021, hitting .312 in 106 games with 14 homers and 87 RBI. 

On November 19, 2021, the Dodgers added Vivas to the 40-man roster to protect him from the Rule 5 draft. He spent 2022 with Great Lakes, where he hit .269 in 128 games. Vivas was optioned to the Double-A Tulsa Drillers to begin the 2023 season.

Ryan Ward

Ryan Joseph Ward (born February 23, 1998) is an American college baseball outfielder in the Los Angeles Dodgers organization.

Ward attended Millbury High School in Millbury, Massachusetts, where he played baseball and was a member of the golf team. As a junior in 2015, he hit .525 with three home runs, 19 RBIs, and seven doubles over 59 at-bats. He went unselected in the 2016 Major League Baseball draft and enrolled at Bryant University to play college baseball. During the summer of 2016, he played for the Worcester Bravehearts of the Futures Collegiate Baseball League.

Ward started the first ten games of his freshman season at Bryant in 2017 before he broke his wrist, forcing him to miss the remainder of the year. As a sophomore in 2018, he batted .409 with eight home runs, 52 RBIs, 22 doubles, and 101 hits over 56 starts. That summer, he played in the New England Collegiate Baseball League with the Ocean State Waves. As a junior in 2019, he played in 58 games and hit .382 with 13 home runs, 51 RBIs, and 12 stolen bases. After the season, he was selected by the Los Angeles Dodgers in the eighth round with the 251st overall selection in the 2019 Major League Baseball draft.

Ward signed with the Dodgers and spent his first professional season with the Ogden Raptors, batting .271 with four home runs, 23 RBIs, and 11 doubles over 49 games. He did not play a game in 2020 due to the cancellation of the minor league season caused by the COVID-19 pandemic. Ward spent the 2021 season with the Great Lakes Loons and slashed .278/.352/.524 with 27 home runs, 84 RBIs, and 21 doubles over 109 games. He spent the 2022 season with the Tulsa Drillers, where he hit .255 in 116 games with 28 home runs and 78 RBIs.

Bryant Bulldogs bio

Kendall Williams

Kendall Allen Williams (born August 24, 2000) is an American professional baseball pitcher in the Los Angeles Dodgers organization.

Williams attended IMG Academy in Bradenton, Florida and was selected by the Toronto Blue Jays in the second round of the 2019 Major League Baseball Draft. He turned down a scholarship offer by Vanderbilt University to sign with the Blue Jays. He began his professional career with the Gulf Coast Blue Jays, where he made five starts (six appearances) and allowed two earned runs in 16 innings. He did not play a minor league game in 2020 since the season was cancelled due to the COVID-19 pandemic. Williams was traded to the Los Angeles Dodgers on September 1, 2020 (along with another player to be named later) in exchange for Ross Stripling. The Dodgers assigned him to the Rancho Cucamonga Quakes of the new Low-A West league for 2021, where he was 3–3 with a 5.98 ERA in 23 appearances (19 starts) and struck out 87 batters while walking 22. In 2022, he began the season with the Quakes and was promoted to the Great Lakes Loons of the High–A Midwest League. He finished with a 3–6 record and 4.32 ERA in 27 games (24 starts).

Full Triple-A to Rookie League rosters
Below are the rosters of the minor league affiliates of the Los Angeles Dodgers

Triple-A

Double-A

High-A

Single-A

Rookie

Foreign Rookie

Arizona Fall League

Player Development Staff
Director, Player Development: Will Rhymes
Assistant Director, Player Development: Matt McGrath
Director, Minor League Pitching: Rob Hill
Director, Player Performance: Brian Stoneberg
Pitching Coordinators: Don Alexander, Brent Minta
Catching Coordinator: Rocky Gale
Hitting Coordinators: Tim Laker, Jeff Salazar

References 

Minor league players
Lists of minor league baseball players